The 2018–19 Drake Bulldogs men's basketball team represented Drake University during the 2018–19 NCAA Division I men's basketball season. The Bulldogs were led by first-year head coach Darian DeVries. They played their home games at Knapp Center in Des Moines, Iowa as members of the Missouri Valley Conference. They finished the season 24–10, 12–6 to earn a share of the MVC regular season championship. As the No. 2 seed in the MVC tournament, they defeated Illinois State before losing to Northern Iowa in the semifinals. They received a bid to the CollegeInsider.com Tournament where they lost in the first round to Southern Utah.

Previous season
The Bulldogs finished the 2017–18 season 17–17, 10–8 in MVC play to finish in to finish in a tie for third place. They lost in the quarterfinals of the MVC tournament to Bradley. They were invited to the CollegeInsider.com Tournament where they defeated Abilene Christian in the first round in a game referred to as the Lou Henson Classic. In the second round they were defeated by Northern Colorado.

On March 22, 2018, it was announced that head coach Niko Medved had accepted the head coaching position at Colorado State, where he had previously served as an assistant. A week after Medved's departure, Drake hired Creighton assistant and Iowa native Darian DeVries for the head coaching job.

Offseason

Departures

Incoming transfers

2018 recruiting class

2019 recruiting class

Roster

Schedule and results

|-
!colspan=9 style=| Exhibition

|-
!colspan=9 style=| Non-conference regular season

|-
!colspan=9 style=| MVC regular season

|-
!colspan=9 style=| MVC tournament

|-
!colspan=12 style=|CollegeInsider.com Postseason tournament

Source

References

Drake Bulldogs men's basketball seasons
Drake
Drake
Drake
Drake